Ullawarra Station, often referred to as Ullawarra, is a pastoral lease that has operated as a sheep station but now operates as a cattle station.

The country is made up of rugged hills, mountains and ridges, narrow valleys, drainage floors and stony plains. Some narrow floodplains of the Henry River are situated within the station boundaries. In 1979 the property was running about 900 cattle and was able to carry about 1,200 head.

Ullawarra was established by Sam Edwards at some time prior to 1897.

The property was bought in 1903 by fellow pioneer A. E. Watts, who remained on the property until 1943.
In 1931 an estimated 13,000 sheep were shorn at Ullawarra.

The traditional owners of the area are the Tharrkari people, who currently lease and manage the station.

See also
List of ranches and stations

References

Pilbara
Pastoral leases in Western Australia
Stations (Australian agriculture)